Vanikoro ligata is a species of very small sea snail, a marine gastropod mollusk in the family Vanikoridae.

Distribution
This species occurs in the Indian Ocean off Aldabra and the Mascarene Basin.

References

 Kilburn, R.N. & Rippey, E. (1982) Sea Shells of Southern Africa. Macmillan South Africa, Johannesburg, xi + 249 pp. page(s): 56
 Drivas, J. & M. Jay (1988). Coquillages de La Réunion et de l'île Maurice

Vanikoridae
Gastropods described in 1843